Gaston Hubin (10 July 1886 – 13 September 1950) was a Belgian footballer who played for Excelsior SC Bruxelles, Léopold, Racing Club Bruxelles and the Belgium national team.

References

External links
 

Belgian footballers
Association football defenders
1886 births
1950 deaths
Belgium international footballers